Polypoetes tulipa is a moth of the family Notodontidae. It is found in south-eastern Peru.

The length of the forewings is 13.5 mm for males. The ground color of the forewings is uniformly blackish brown. The ground color of the hindwings is blackish gray from the base, the outer margin broadly banded with black from apex to tornus.

Etymology
The name is derived from the Latin word for tulip and refers to an orange, tulip-shaped subapical spot on the forewing.

References

Moths described in 2008
Notodontidae of South America